Clifford W. Bouvette (September 15, 1897 – April 5, 1972) was an American newspaper editor and politician.

Bouvette was born in Hallock, Kittson County, Minnesota. He went to the Hallock public schools and studied law in Grand Forks, North Dakota for two years. Bouvette was the editor and owner of the Kittson County Enterprise weekly newspaper. Bouvette served in the Minnesota House of Representatives in 1937 and 1938.

References

1897 births
1972 deaths
People from Hallock, Minnesota
Editors of Minnesota newspapers
Members of the Minnesota House of Representatives